, (1 January 1943 - 30 May 2012), of Kanagawa Prefecture, Japan, was a Japanese singer. He was noted for his dynamic singing voice and sideburns. His nickname was "Kieyo".

Career 

He grew up in Chigasaki City, Kanagawa Prefecture. His grandfather is British. In 1971, he released his greatest hit, 'Mata Au Hi Made' ('Until the Day We Meet Again'). It sold over a million copies and won the Japan Record Award at the 13th Japan Record Awards as well as the Japan Music Award. The scenes of him holding up the Japan Record Awards trophy, smiling and flashing the "V sign", as well as the subsequent live performance, are still played on television to this day.

Filmography

References

External links 
 尾崎紀世彦 - UNIVERSAL MUSIC JAPAN 
 日本コロムビア | 尾崎紀世彦 
 尾崎紀世彦 | Sony Music 

1943 births
2012 deaths
Japanese-language singers
Musicians from Tokyo
Japanese jazz singers
Universal Music Japan artists